Baliochila stygia is a butterfly in the family Lycaenidae. It is found along the coast of Kenya and in Tanzania (on the north coast, including Pemba Island). Its habitat consists of coastal forests.

References

Butterflies described in 1953
Poritiinae